Belmont Plantation may refer to:

Any one of several Belmont Plantations in Louisiana
Belmont Manor House, also known as Belmont Plantation, in Loudoun County, Virginia
Belmont Plantation (Wayside, Mississippi)
Belmont Plantation (Albemarle County, Virginia), north of Shadwell, Virginia

See also
Belmont (disambiguation)